The 1987 Gatineau municipal election was held on November 1, 1987, to elect a mayor and councillors in Gatineau, Quebec, Canada. Incumbent mayor Gaétan Cousineau was narrowly re-elected over a challenge from former mayor John Luck.

Results

Mayor

Council

Post-election changes

Gaétan Cousineau resigned as mayor in early 1988, and a by-election was held to choose his replacement.

Jean Deschênes was born on March 26, 1940, in Sainte-Flavie, Quebec. He has a Bachelor of Arts degree from the University of Ottawa, began working as a school principal in 1972, and later received a Master of Public Administration degree. Deschênes first ran for mayor of Gatineau in 1979, losing to incumbent John Luck, and ran a second time in a by-election called after the resignation of Gaetan Cousineau in 1988. He highlighted his skills as an administrator and sought a municipal tax freeze in the latter campaign. Despite an endorsement from Luck, he finished third against Robert Labine. He was later elected to the Gatineau city council in 1995, representing the city’s fifth ward. In 1996, Deschênes was arrested by Gatineau police under very controversial circumstances while returning home from a charity function; despite passing three breathalyzer tests, he was taken to the station in handcuffs and given a fourth test before being released. The officers were later reprimanded for not following proper procedure. At the time of the incident, Deschênes chaired a city committee that was looking into cutbacks for city staff, including the police; he, and many others, later described the police actions as intimidation and harassment. He was narrowly defeated by Joseph de Sylva in 1999. He also sought election in 2001, but was defeated. Deschênes has been active in the Liberal Party of Canada.
Hubert Leroux was born in Hawkesbury, Ontario. An insurance broker, he served on the Gatineau city council from 1979 to 1987. Known as a maverick politician, Leroux was one of only two councillors to vote against the city's 1986 budget, arguing that more spending cuts could have been made. He also opposed Mayor Gaétan Cousineau's plans for a new city hall building. He lost to Richard Canuel in the 1987 election. He was forty-eight years old during the 1988 election and described himself as a "small-c" conservative. The latter point notwithstanding, he called for a significant business tax increase to keep property taxes down.

Sources: "Final official results of weekend Outaouais civic elections," Ottawa Citizen, 6 November 1987, C3; "Cousineau wins, Luck continues to contest result" [mayoral recount], Ottawa Citizen, 16 November 1987, C1; David Gamble, "Labine wins tight race for mayor in Gatineau," Ottawa Citizen, 6 June 1988, A1.

References

1987 Quebec municipal elections
1987